Science Oxford is part of a charitable organisation called The Oxford Trust, based in Oxford, England. Science Oxford is the trust's education and engagement branch. The Oxford Trust was founded in 1985 by Sir Martin and Lady Audrey Wood. Science Oxford was founded in 2006. Science Oxford operates the Science Oxford Centre, a science museum located in Headington, and educational programmes.

References

External links
Science Oxford website

1985 establishments in England
Organizations established in 1985
Organisations based in Oxford
Education in Oxford
Science and technology in the United Kingdom
Tourist attractions in Oxford
Science museums in England
Museums in Oxford